Saint-Pierremont is the name of several communes in France:

 Saint-Pierremont, Aisne, in the Aisne département
 Saint-Pierremont, Ardennes, in the Ardennes département
 Saint-Pierremont, Vosges, in the Vosges département